Lettre à la prison  is a 1969 French film directed by Marc Scialcom. It was left in a box until 2005, when Scialcom's daughter found it and had it restored.

Synopsis 
In 1970, Tahar, a young Tunisian, travels to France for the first time to help his older brother, who is wrongly accused of murder and incarcerated in Paris. He first stops in Marseille, where he meets Tunisians very different from those familiar to him; enigmatic French people; and a strange atmosphere that makes him doubt his brother's innocence, his own innocence and his own mental integrity.

Awards 
 Festival Internacional de Documentales de Marsella, 2008
 Premio Anno Uno Festival del cinema e delle Arti I Milleocchi, Trieste (Italy), 2012

References 

 CC BY-SA 3.0.

External links

Bibliography
Mila Lazic, Silvia Tarquini, Marc Scialom. Impasse du cinéma. Esilio, memoria, utopia / Exil, mémoire, utopie, Artdigiland, 2012 (it., fr.)
Mila Lazic, Silvia Tarquini (sous la direction de), Lettre à la prison de Marc Scialom. Le film manquant à la Nouvelle Vague, Artdigiland, 2013 (fr.)

1969 films
French prison films
1960s French films
French drama films